Nica or NICA may refer to:
 Nīca, a village in Latvia
 Nica, the name in some languages of Nice, a French city
 Nica is an adjective which may refer to: 
 Nicaragua
 Nicaraguan people
 Nica Airlines, an alternate name for Nicaragüense de Aviación, a Nicaraguan airline
 National Institute of Circus Arts, an Australian circus school
 National Intelligence Coordinating Agency, a government agency in the Philippines
 Nica (butterfly), a genus of nymphalid butterflies in the Biblidinae subfamily
 National Ice Carving Association, a U.S. ice sculpture association
 Netherlands Indies Civil Administration, the World War II-era Dutch colonial administration in Indonesia
 Nicotine Anonymous (NicA), a stop-smoking program
 Northern Ireland Court of Appeal, part of the Courts of Northern Ireland
 Nuclotron-based Ion Collider fAcility, a proton and heavy ion collider under construction at JINR in Dubna, Russia

People with the name
 Nica de Koenigswarter
 Domenica "Nica" Baccalieri, a fictional character on The Sopranos